Emile Ounei (born 30 January 1996), is a New Caledonian international footballer who plays as a forward for Magenta.

International career
Ounei marked his international debut with a penalty goal in a 2–1 win against Fiji. In November 2016 Ounei scored the equalizer in a 1-1 draw in an international friendly against Estonia.

Career statistics

International

International goals
Scores and results list New Caledonia's goal tally first.

References

External links
 

1996 births
Living people
New Caledonian footballers
New Caledonia international footballers
Association football forwards
AS Magenta players